The 1971–72 National Hurling League was the 41st season of the National Hurling League (NHL), an annual hurling competition for the GAA county teams.

Overview

Structure

The National Hurling League's top division featured sixteen teams divided into two groups - 1A and 1B. Each group consisted of eight teams. The top two teams in Division 1A advance to the semi-finals. The third- and fourth-placed teams in 1A, as well as the top two from 1B, play in the quarter-finals.

Overview
 In spite of a poor standing in the group stages, having won just three of their seven games, Cork won their third league title in four seasons.  Limerick, who were league runners-up, actually finished above Cork in the group stage, however, they fell to 'the Rebels' in the final.

Down at the other end of the tables, Dublin won just one of their group stage games and were relegated to Division 1B.  They swapped places with Galway who, having enjoyed an unbeaten run in the group stage, topped Division 1B and gained promotion to the top eight in Division 1A for the following season.  Westmeath lost all seven of their group stage games and finished bottom of Division 1B, however, they were not relegated to Division 2 as there was no promotion or relegation between these two separate divisions.

Tables

Division 1A

Division 1B

Results

Group stage

Knock-out stage

League statistics

Scoring

Widest winning margin: 21 points
Waterford 9-13 : 4-7 Laois
Most goals in a match: 13
Waterford 9-13 : 4-7 Laois
Most points in a match: 28
Cork 3-14 : 2-14 Limerick
Most goals by one team in a match: 9
Waterford 9-13 : 4-7 Laois
Most goals scored by a losing team: 5
Dublin 5-6 : 4-13 Wexford
Most points scored by a losing team: 14 
Waterford 0-14 : 3-12 Kildare
Limerick 2-14 : 3-14 Cork

Top scorers

Season

Single game

References

National Hurling League seasons
League
League